Trigonopterus bornensis is a species of flightless weevil in the genus Trigonopterus from Indonesia.

Etymology
The specific name is derived from that of the island of Borneo.

Description
Individuals measure 2.35–2.81 mm in length.  General coloration is a dark rust-color, with a black pronotum and lightly rust-colored antennae.

Range

Phylogeny
T. bornensis is part of the T. bornensis species group.

References

bornensis
Beetles described in 2014
Beetles of Asia